Sir John Thomson  (3 April 19082 January 1998) was an English banker. He was the chairman of Barclays Bank from 1962 to 1973.

Early life
John Thomson was born on 3 April 1908. He was educated at Winchester College, and earned a degree in law at Magdalen College, Oxford.

Military service
During World War II, he served as an officer in the Royal Artillery and commanded the Oxfordshire Yeomanry with the rank of lieutenant colonel.

Career
He joined Barclays Bank in 1947 and was its chairman from 1962 to 1973. He was knighted KBE in the 1972 New Year Honours.

Other Roles
Thomson was Lord Lieutenant of Oxfordshire from 1963 to 1979; and a steward (director) of the Jockey Club from 1974 to 1977.

Death
He died on 2 January 1998.

References

External links

 

1908 births
1998 deaths
People educated at Winchester College
Alumni of Magdalen College, Oxford
British chairpersons of corporations
Chairmen of Barclays
Lord-Lieutenants of Oxfordshire
Royal Artillery officers
British Army personnel of World War II
Knights Commander of the Order of the British Empire